Turkey is a predominantly Muslim nation that has abolished polygamy, which was officially criminalized with the adoption of the Turkish Civil Code in 1926, a milestone in Atatürk's secularist reforms. Penalties for illegal polygamy are up to 2 years imprisonment. Turkey has long been known for its promotion of secularism and later introduced even stricter bars on polygamy. Even the ruling moderate AK Parti effectively banned polygamists from entering or living in the country.

Although illegal polygamy is very rare in Turkish society, the practice still exists in the Kurdish populated South East.

References

See also 
Turkish women
Secularism in Turkey
Women in Turkish politics
Religion in Turkey

Turkey
Turkish culture
Politics of Turkey